NGC 777 is an elliptical galaxy in the constellation of Triangulum. It was discovered by William Herschel on September 12, 1784. It has a weak active nucleus of type Seyfert 2 or LINER 2, implying that the central region is obscured. It may be an outlying member of galaxy cluster Abell 262.

References

External links
 

0777
Elliptical galaxies
Triangulum (constellation)
17840912
007584